Goodenia disperma is a species of flowering plant in the family Goodeniaceae and is endemic to Queensland. It is an erect undershrub with linear leaves on the stem, and racemes of white flowers.

Description

Taxonomy and naming
Goodenia disperma was first formally described in 1859 by Ferdinand von Mueller in Fragmenta Phytographiae Australiae. In 1990, Roger Charles Carolin selected specimens collected near the Dawson River as the lectotype. The specific epithet (disperma) means "double-seeded".

Distribution and habitat
This goodenia grows in forest and woodland on the tableland from west of Townsville to west of Bundaberg in Queensland.

Conservation status
Goddenia disperma is classified as of "least concern" under the Queensland Government Nature Conservation Act 1992.

References

disperma
Flora of Queensland
Plants described in 1859
Taxa named by Ferdinand von Mueller
Endemic flora of Australia